Flax honeyi is a moth of the family Erebidae first described by Michael Fibiger in 2011. It is found on the Solomon Islands (it was described from Santa Isabel Island).

The wingspan is about 9 mm. The labial palps, head, patagia, basal part of tegulae and thorax are brownish black. The forewings (including fringes) are beige, with blackish-brown subterminal and terminal areas. The base of the costa and all medial area are also blackish brown with a black dot in the inner lower area. The crosslines are indistinct, except for the blackish-brown subterminal line and the terminal line, which is indicated by dark-brown interveinal dots. The hindwings are light grey without a discal spot. The underside of the forewings is unicolorous brown and the underside of the hindwings is grey with a discal spot.

References

Micronoctuini
Moths described in 2011
Taxa named by Michael Fibiger